The Inuit languages, like other Eskimo–Aleut languages, exhibit a regular agglutinative and heavily suffixing morphology. The languages are rich in suffixes, making words very long and potentially unique. For example, in Nunavut Inuktitut:

This long word is composed of a root word tusaa- – to hear – followed by seven suffixes (a vowel-beginning suffix always erases the final consonant of the preceding consonant-ending suffix):
 -tsiaq-: "well"
 -junnaq- (or -gunnaq-): "be able to"
 -nngit-: negation
 -tu(q): indicative third-person singular (in fact a nominal form)
 -alu(k)-: augmentative ("very")
 -u-: "be" 
 -junga: indicative first-person singular (itself composed of the indicative morpheme -ju- and the first person marker -nga)

Note the consonant sandhi (see Inuit phonology): The /q/ from -tsiaq- followed by the /j/ from -junnaq- becomes ‹r› , a single consonant taking its point of articulation from /q/ and its manner of articulation from /j/. The /q/ from -junnaq- is assimilated into the /ŋŋ/ of -nngit-, because Inuktitut forbids triple length consonants, and because the morphophonological rules attached to -nngit- require it to delete any consonant that comes before it.

This sort of word construction is pervasive in Inuit languages and makes it very unlike English. In one large Inuktitut corpus – the Nunavut Hansard – 92% of all words appear only once, in contrast to a small percentage in most English corpora of similar size. This makes the application of Zipf's law quite difficult.

Furthermore, the notion of a part of speech can be somewhat complicated in Inuit languages. Fully inflected verbs can be interpreted as nouns. The word ilisaijuq can be interpreted as a fully inflected verb – "he studies" – but can also be interpreted as a noun: "student".

Because of the languages’ rich and complicated morphology, this article can present only a limited and unsystematic sample of its features. It is based largely on the Inuktitut dialects of north Baffin Island and central Nunavut. The morphology and syntax of Inuit language varies to some degree between dialects, but the basic principles will generally apply to all of them and to some degree to Yupik as well.

Nouns

Verbs in main clauses
Inuktitut verbs fall into two major categories with different morphological properties: non-specific verbs and specific verbs. Many verbs belong in both categories, and can take either set of endings depending on the type of information about the verb's arguments that speakers intend to communicate. Others are restricted to one category or require a morphological change in order to move between categories.

Every fully inflected Inuktitut verb can act alone as a proposition. No other words are required to form a syntactically correct sentence.

This section will only cover two of the most common sets of endings for these two verb classes and a small selection of verbal modifiers. Inuktitut has a large and diverse set of verbal inflections, of which this article can only cover a small portion designed to give some sense of how the Inuktitut language works.

Non-specific verbs
Non-specific verbs are verbs that either are intransitive (they have no direct object), or have an indefinite noun as their object. In English, an indefinite noun is marked by the lack of the article the or, if the noun is singular (and countable) the article a(n). In Inuktitut, when it is the object of a verb, it is distinguished by the use of a non-specific verb and particular suffix described below. A definite noun, in contrast, requires the use of a specific verb when it is the object of a verb.

Non-specific indicative conjugation
As a general rule, a correctly formed Inuktitut verb must start with a root and end with a suffix that indicates the grammatical person of its subject:

The indicative is the simplest form of the verb in Inuktitut, and for state verbs – verbs indicating a condition or a situation – this form indicates the present tense: The condition or situation is presently the case. For action verbs, it indicates that the action has recently been completed, mixing tense and aspect. Inuktitut verbs are divided into state verbs and action verbs. However, the distinction may not match how non-Inuktitut speakers would categorise verbs. For example, the verb root pisuk-, meaning "to be walking" – is a state verb in Inuktitut.

 – I am walking. (right now)

When the verb root ends in a consonant, the suffixes that indicate the grammatical person all begin with t. For example, pisuk- – to be walking – is conjugated as follows:

Verb roots that end in a vowel have suffixes that start with a j. For example, ani- – to go out:

Note that Inuktitut has a fully productive dual number, present in all three persons.

Alternative form
There is an alternative form of the above conjugation which is used in different ways and to different degrees depending on dialect. Instead of starting with t after a consonant and j after a vowel, this form starts with p after a consonant and v after a vowel. The exact difference varies from dialect to dialect. In western dialects, including Inuinnaqtun and Inupiatun, only the t/j forms are ever used for statements and the p/v form is rarely if ever heard. In Greenland, only the p/v form is used. In the central and eastern Canadian dialects, both forms are used.

Interrogatives
There are additional p/v forms used in Nunavut to indicate interrogative statements – asking questions – although they may indicate other subtle distinctions of aspect. When they are used to ask questions, the last vowel may be doubled to indirectly indicate rising pitch. So, the question "Are we there yet?" can be written as ? (tikip- – to arrive, and for -pita see the table below) but may also be written as ?

This way, one can very compactly pose and answer simple yes/no questions:

Subjects
The subject of a non-specific verb has no special morphological mark:

Objects
The object of a non-specific verb must end in a suffix that indicates its syntactic role:

The object of a non-specific verb takes one of the suffixes below, depending on its number:

{| class="wikitable"
|-
! colspan=3 | Indefinite suffixes
|-
! Singular
| 
| /m/ nasalises a preceding consonant
|-
! Dual
| 
| deletes any preceding consonant and doubles the length of the preceding vowel
|-
! Plural
| 
| /n/ nasalises a preceding consonant
|}

An example using the verb taku- – to see – and inuviniq – dead person:

 {| class="wikitable"
|-
! Singular:
| 
|-
! Dual:
| 
|-
! Plural:
| 
|}

To say "I see the dead person" or "I see the dead people" requires a specific verb, which is described in the section below.

Specific verbs
Specific verbs – verbs whose objects are definite as opposed to indefinite – take suffixes that indicate the grammatical person of both the subject and the object, but not their grammatical number.

Specific indicative conjugation

Note that the suffixes in this table cannot be used for reflexive verbs. That will be discussed separately.

Alternative form
As with non-specific verbs, specific verbs have an alternate v/p form used to the exclusion of j/t forms in Greenland, to some extent interchangeably in Nunavut, and not at all in the west:

Interrogatives
The specific interrogative is also sometimes used to indicate conditional forms or other aspects. It overlaps heavily with the v/p alternative form described above:

Subjects
The subject of a specific verb requires a specific suffix to indicate its syntactic role:

The subject of a specific verb takes the following suffixes, depending on its grammatical number:

All of the suffixes above delete any consonant that immediately precedes them. For example, qajaq becomes qajaup in the singular, qajaak in the dual, and qajait in the plural when it is the subject of a specific verb.

So, as an example:

Objects
The object of a specific verb needs no particular suffix at all. Thus, we can contrast Inuviniq takujara – I see the dead person – with the table for non-specific verbs above. Continuing the example from above:

Changing verb classes
Some verbs are automatically both specific and non-specific verbs, depending only on which suffixes they receive. The verb taku- – to see – is one example. However, other verbs require an additional suffix to shift classes.

Many action verbs that specifically involve an actor performing an action on another are specific verbs that take the suffix -si- in order to become non-specific verbs:

Many verbs of emotion alternate between the suffixes -suk- and -gi- to change whether or not they are specific:

This is important when attributing an emotion to a person without designating the cause. To do so, Inuktitut always uses the non-specific form:

Reflexive verbs
A reflexive verb is a verb which must have both an object and a subject, but where, in some context, both the object and the subject are identical. In Inuktitut, this situation is expressed by using a specific verb but by affixing a non-specific ending to it.

Verbs in secondary clauses
A verb that has been fully inflected as described above is a complete proposition able to stand on its own. However, when clauses are linked in Inuktitut, a number of other morphosyntactic phenomena come into play.

First, many secondary structures use other classes of verb suffixes that those used in main clauses. This article cannot cover the whole of Inuktitut morphology, especially since each class of inflexion has its own set of non-specific and specific endings and they vary significantly from dialect to dialect. The examples below are based on the North Baffin dialect.

Fourth person inflection
In secondary clauses, third person inflexions must make a distinction between instances where the two clauses have the same subject and those where the subject is different. In English, the sentence "He is leaving because he is tired" is ambiguous unless you know whether or not the two "he"s refer to different people. In Inuktitut, in contrast, this situation is clearly marked:

The set of suffixes used to indicate the other third person is sometimes called the third person different, but is also often called the fourth person. This additional grammatical person is a pervasive feature of Inuktitut.

Causative
The causative is used to link propositions that follow logically. It is much more broadly used in Inuktitut than similar structures are in English. The causative is one of the most important ways of connecting two clauses in Inuktitut:

Conditional & subjunctive
This structure has a meaning closer to an "if... then..." sentence in English than the kind of structure usually referred to as "conditional". It generally involves using an additional marker of the future tense or the conditional mood in the main clause:

Frequentative
The frequentative endings indicate that two propositions routinely occur together. In English, this is expressed with words like usually, often, generally and whenever. It generally involves using an additional marker in the main clause to indicate frequency:

Dubitative
The dubitative suffixes express uncertainty or disbelief about a proposition:

Verb modifiers
In addition to root verb morphemes and inflexions to indicate the number and person of the arguments, Inuktitut has a large inventory of morphemes that modify the verb and may be placed between the root morpheme and inflexions, or at the end of the inflected verb. In pedagogic and linguistic literature on Inuktitut, these infix morphemes are often called verb chunks. These modifiers indicate tense, aspect, manner and a variety of functions that in English require auxiliary verbs, adverbs, or other structures.

This section can only list a small selection of the many verb chunks, in order to give a sense for how the system works:

Modifiers of manner

Consequently one can say:

Modifiers of tense
While Indo-European languages tend to make tense distinctions in terms of before or after some reference event, Inuktitut makes a number of somewhat fuzzy distinctions depending on how far into the past or the future the event took place. In English, this distinction requires additional words to place the event in time, but in Inuktitut the tense marker itself carries much of that information.

Ergativity in Inuktitut
Inuktitut marks the subject of a non-specific verb and the object of a specific verb in the same way – the absence of a specific morphological marker – and marks the subject of a specific verb and the object of a non-specific verb with particular morphological elements. This kind of morphosyntactic structure is often called an ergative structure. However, ergativity in its most clearly defined instances is primarily about transitive and intransitive verbs. This dichotomy is not identical to the specific/non-specific verb distinction in Inuktitut, since Inuktitut usage is also concerned with the definiteness of the objects of verb,

Consequently, the application of the notion of ergativity to Inuktitut, and to many other languages, is somewhat controversial. Regardless, by analogy with more conventionally ergative languages, the -up, -k, -it endings described above are often called ergative suffixes which are taken to be indicative of the ergative case, while the -mik, -rnik, -nik endings (see Non-specific verbs – Objects) are called accusative. This usage is often seen in linguistics literature describing Inuktitut, and sometimes in pedagogic literature and dictionaries, but remains a quite foreign vocabulary to most Inuit.

See also
 Greenlandic grammar

References
Inuktitut Linguistics for Technocrats, Mick Mallon. [covers Inuktitut nominal morphology omitted from this article]
Introductory Inuktitut and Introductory Inuktitut Reference Grammar, Mick Mallon, 1991.  and 
Inuktitut: A multi-dialectal outline dictionary (with an Aivilingmiutaq base), Alex Spalding, 1998. 
Inuktitut: a Grammar of North Baffin Dialects, Alex Spalding, 1992. 
Arctic Languages: An Awakening, ed: Dirmid R. F. Collis.  Available in PDF via the UNESCO website.
 Textbook Let's Learn Eskimo (2nd Ed.), Donald H. Webster, 1968. Fairbanks, Alaska.

Although as many of the examples as possible are novel or extracted from Inuktitut texts, some of the examples in this article are drawn from Introductory Inuktitut and Inuktitut Linguistics for Technocrats.

External linksDictionaries and lexicaInuktut Grammar Dictionary
Tusaalanga: Learn Inuktut On-line
Inuktitut – English Dictionary

Interactive IñupiaQ Dictionary
Oqaasileriffik Language databaseWebpages A Brief History of Inuktitut Writing Culture
 Our Language, Our Selves 
 Alt.folklore.urban on Eskimo words for snow.Arctic Languages: An Awakening', ed: Dirmid R. F. Collis.  Available in PDF via the UNESCO website (chapter with Inuit grammar).

SP:specific
NSP:non-specific

1
Native American grammars